Beaver Creek is a  long tributary of Camas Creek in the U.S. state of Idaho. Beginning at an elevation of  near Monida Pass in northern Clark County, it flows generally south through the communities of Humphrey, Spencer, and Dubois. It is roughly paralleled by Interstate 15 for its entire length.

See also
 List of rivers of Idaho
 List of longest streams of Idaho

References

Rivers of Clark County, Idaho
Rivers of Jefferson County, Idaho
Rivers of Idaho